Alan Mark Poul (born May 1, 1954) is an American film and television producer and director.

Career
Poul served as executive producer for the HBO original series, Six Feet Under, on which he made his directing debut. He directed four episodes of the series from seasons two through five.

He later directed the pilot for CBS' series Swingtown, of which he directed a total of four episodes. He also directed the 2010 CBS Films romantic comedy The Back-Up Plan, originally titled Plan B.

He signed a new deal with HBO in April 2011. He was an executive producer of Aaron Sorkin's The Newsroom. He also directed five episodes of the show in the first two seasons.

Poul was an executive producer on Tokyo Vice and directed its final episode, Yoshino. He is fluent in Japanese.

Poul has been nominated for 7 Primetime Emmys, a Directors Guild of America award, and won a News & Documentary Emmy Award in Outstanding Historical Program for The Pacific Century.

Credits

Theatre
"Vagabond Stars" 1978 (lyricist) Pre-Broadway: Berkshire Theatre Festival. Starring: Lewis Stadlen, Marilyn Sokol, Robert M. Rosen aka Robert Ozn, Paul Kreppel

References

External links

1954 births
American film directors
American film producers
American television directors
American television producers
LGBT film directors
LGBT television directors
Living people
Yale University alumni
21st-century LGBT people